Chamely Khatun (born 11 November 1988) is a Bangladeshi former cricketer who played as a right-handed batter. She played for Bangladesh between 2007 and 2011, before the side was granted full international status. She played domestic cricket for Dhaka Division.

Career

Asian Games
Chamely was part of the team that won a silver medal in cricket against the China women's national cricket team at the 2010 Asian Games in Guangzhou, China.

References

External links
 
 

1988 births
Living people
People from Rajshahi District
Bangladeshi women cricketers
Dhaka Division women cricketers
Cricketers at the 2010 Asian Games
Asian Games medalists in cricket
Asian Games silver medalists for Bangladesh
Bangladesh women One Day International cricketers
Medalists at the 2010 Asian Games